MobileCoin is a peer-to-peer cryptocurrency developed by MobileCoin Inc., which was founded in 2017 by Josh Goldbard and Shane Glynn.

Technology overview 

MobileCoin claims to focus on transactional anonymity (fungibility), ease of use, transaction speed, low environmental impact and low fees. MobileCoin's mechanics build on Stellar (for consensus) and Monero (for privacy), using CryptoNote alongside zero-knowledge proofs to hide details of users' transactions.

The MobileCoin company claims the cryptocurrency can facilitate decentralized payments for everyday transactions more quickly than most other cryptocurrencies.

MobileCoin is a one dimensional cryptocurrency blockchain. Blocks use a consensus protocol originally developed for the Stellar payment network. Transactions are validated in SGX secure enclaves and are based on elliptic-curve cryptography. Transaction inputs are shown to exist in the blockchain with Merkle proofs of membership and are signed with Schnorr-style multilayered linkable ring signature, and output amounts (communicated to recipients via ECDH) are concealed with Pedersen commitments and proven in a legitimate range with non-interactive zero-knowledge proofs.

Much of MobileCoin's technology comes from previous privacy focused cryptocurrencies like Monero and has been re-written in Rust for MobileCoin.

History 
MobileCoin Inc., the entity behind MobileCoin, was founded in 2017 by Joshua Goldbard and Shane Glynn. Signal's Moxie Marlinspike assisted as an early technical advisor. The coin is intended to be an accessible form of cryptocurrency with a focus on fast transactions. In May 2018, MobileCoin secured $29.7 million in a funding round led by Binance Labs, in exchange for 37.5 million tokens. The foundation raised $11.35 million in venture funding in March 2021 and $66 million in Series B funding in August 2021.

Payment and trading 
In-app payments via Signal and Mixin Messenger support MobileCoin for peer-to-peer payments worldwide. Cryptocurrency exchanges FTX and Bitfinex list MobileCoin for trading.

Criticism 
The integration of MobileCoin wallets into the popular security messager app Signal received criticism. Security expert Bruce Schneier, who previously praised the app, stated that this would bloat the app and attract unwanted attention from the financial authorities.

References

Cryptocurrencies